The non-marine molluscs of East Timor are a part of the molluscan fauna of East Timor (wildlife of East Timor). A number of species of non-marine molluscs are found in the wild in East Timor.

Freshwater gastropods

Land gastropods

Clausiliidae
 Phaedusa ramelauensis Köhler & Mayer, 2016
 Phaedusa angustocostata Köhler & Mayer, 2016

Diplommatinidae
 Diplommatina atauroensis Köhler & Kessner, 2020
 Diplommatina fluminis B. Rensch, 1931
 Palaina ainaro Köhler & Kessner, 2020
 Palaina orelimo Köhler & Kessner, 2020
 Palaina tuba Köhler & Kessner, 2020
 Palaina brandontrani Köhler & Kessner, 2020
 Palaina mutis Greke, 2017

Enidae
 Apoecus apertus (Martens, 1863)
 Apoecus ramelauensis Köhler, Criscione, Burghardt & Kessner, 2016

Camaenidae
 Landouria montana Köhler, Shea & Kessner, 2019
 Landouria timorensis Köhler, Shea & Kessner, 2019
 Landouria winteriana (Pfeiffer, 1842)
 Parachloritis afranio Köhler & Kessner, 2014
 Parachloritis atauroensis Köhler & Kessner, 2014
 Parachloritis baucauensis Köhler & Kessner, 2014
 Parachloritis herculea Köhler & Kessner, 2014
 Parachloritis laritame Köhler & Kessner, 2014
 Parachloritis manuelmendesi Köhler & Kessner, 2014
 Parachloritis mariae (Nobre, 1917)
 Parachloritis mendax (Martens, 1864)
 Parachloritis mundiperdidi Köhler & Kessner, 2014
 Parachloritis newtoni (Nobre, 1917)
 Parachloritis ninokonisi Köhler & Kessner, 2014
 Parachloritis nusatenggarae Köhler & Kessner, 2014
 Parachloritis pseudolandouria Köhler & Kessner, 2014
 Parachloritis ramelau Köhler & Kessner, 2014
 Parachloritis reidi Köhler & Kessner, 2014
 Parachloritis renschi Köhler & Kessner, 2014
 Parachloritis sylvatica Köhler & Kessner, 2014

Freshwater bivalves

See also

 List of marine molluscs of East Timor
 List of non-marine molluscs of Indonesia

References

Molluscs
East Timor